Fernando Hernán Guajardo Leiva (born 19 April 1968), is a Chilean football manager and former professional player who played as a forward for clubs in Chile and Indonesia.

Career
Born in San Miguel, Santiago, Guajardo is a product of Palestino youth system, making appearances for the first team in Copa Chile. As a member of Palestino, he had stints on loan at Deportes Valdivia and Curicó Unido.

In Chile, he also played for Unión La Calera, Everton, Santiago Wanderers, Magallanes and Unión San Felipe.

As a member of Santiago Wanderers, he won the 1995 Segunda División, alongside players such as Claudio Núñez,  and Jorge Almirón.

In 2000, he moved to Indonesia and played for Persija Jakarta, Gelora Putra Delta, Persik Kediri and PSDS Deli Serdang.

Coaching career
Guajardo has an extensive career as coach at the youth ranks of Unión La Calera, San Luis and Unión San Felipe, with an experience as caretaker in the last. From 2020 to 2021 he had an experience as head coach in Deportes Vallenar in both the Segunda División Profesional and the Tercera A.

Since September 2022, he works as head coach of the San Luis youth ranks.

Honours
Santiago Wanderers
 Primera B de Chile: 1995

References

External links
 Fernando Guajardo at PlaymakerStats.com
 Fernando Guajardo at MemoriaWanderers.cl 
 

1968 births
Living people
Footballers from Santiago
Chilean footballers
Chilean expatriate footballers
Club Deportivo Palestino footballers
Deportes Valdivia footballers
Curicó Unido footballers
Unión La Calera footballers
Everton de Viña del Mar footballers
Santiago Wanderers footballers
Deportes Magallanes footballers
Magallanes footballers
Unión San Felipe footballers
Persija Jakarta players
Deltras F.C. players
Persik Kediri players
PSDS Deli Serdang players
Chilean Primera División players
Primera B de Chile players
Tercera División de Chile players
Indonesian Premier Division players
Chilean expatriate sportspeople in Indonesia
Expatriate footballers in Indonesia
Association football forwards
Chilean football managers
Unión San Felipe managers
Primera B de Chile managers
Segunda División Profesional de Chile managers